WNJR can refer to:

 WNJR (FM), a radio station (91.7 FM) licensed to Washington, Pennsylvania, United States
 WNJR (AM), a defunct (1430 AM) radio station licensed to Newark, New Jersey, United States